Lebohang Ntsinyi is the ambassador of Lesotho to the People's Republic of China.

Ntsinyi is the deputy secretary-general of the Lesotho Congress for Democracy party.

Ntsinyi was Lesotho's Minister of Tourism until 2010.

References

Living people
Lesotho women in politics
Women ambassadors
Government ministers of Lesotho
Women government ministers of Lesotho
Ambassadors of Lesotho to China
Lesotho Congress for Democracy politicians
Year of birth missing (living people)